Mulah (Dhivehi: މުލައް) or Boli Mulah   is one of the inhabited islands of Meemu Atoll.

Geography

Demography

Healthcare
Boli Mulah has a medical centre and a pharmacy.

Utilities
Sewage facilities were contracted to be built by September 2015, and safe drinking water was contracted to be provided for the island from December 2014. The sewage system was officially opened in July 2018 by President Abdulla Yameen.

References

Populated places in the Maldives
Islands of the Maldives